The 1918 Canterbury by-election was held on 9 August 1918.  The by-election was held due to the death of the incumbent Conservative MP, Francis Bennett-Goldney.  It was won by the Conservative candidate George Knox Anderson who was unopposed due to a War-time electoral pact.

References

1918 in England
History of Canterbury
1918 elections in the United Kingdom
By-elections to the Parliament of the United Kingdom in Kent constituencies
Unopposed by-elections to the Parliament of the United Kingdom (need citation)
1910s in Kent